The World Reformed Fellowship (WRF) is an ecumenical Christian organization which promotes unity between confessional Calvinist churches around the world.

History 
The World Fellowship of Reformed Churches was formed in 1994 by the Presbyterian Church in America, the National Presbyterian Church in Mexico, and the Presbyterian Church of Brazil, as well as member churches mainly from Latin American countries and from India, East Africa and the United States. The  International Reformed Fellowship (IRF) was formed also in 1994 with Calvinist churches in Indonesia, Taiwan, Japan, and from all part of Asia.

The World Fellowship of Reformed Churches and the International Reformed Fellowship united on October 24, 2000 to form the World Reformed Fellowship. The WRF is now an international body represented in seventy-nine countries.

Members have to agree with:
 The statement that "The Scriptures of the Old and New Testament are without error in all that they teach."
 At least one of the following historic Reformed Confessions - The Gallican Confession, The Belgic Confession, The Heidelberg Catechism, The Thirty-Nine Articles, The Second Helvetic Confession, The Canons of Dort, The Westminster Confession of Faith, the London Confession of 1689, the Savoy Declaration, or the WRF Statement of Faith.

The World Reformed Fellowship desires to promote Calvinist thinking and evangelism, encourage churches and people to embrace Calvinist thinking and to provide forum for dialogue.

It is similar in theology to the International Conference of Reformed Churches and more conservative than the World Communion of Reformed Churches. The WRF also differs from them in that it is a fellowship, not a council, and so includes in its membership not only denominations, but individual congregations, pastors and theologians, and non-ecclesial organizations (e.g. theological seminaries). It conceives of its existence as facilitating dialogue and sharing of resources between the different global branches of Calvinism.

There are a total of 73 denominational members of the Fellowship and 115 organizational members, as of May 15, 2020.

The Fourth General Assembly of the World Reformed Fellowship was held in Sao Paulo, Brazil in March 2015. This General Assembly approved a new statement of faith which had been completed March 31, 2011. This statement includes twelve articles and was made to accomplish three purposes:
 To express accurately the contents of the other historic Calvinist confessions which members are required to hold to at least one of. 
 To apply the Calvinist faith to specific issues that the 21st-century church is facing.
 To include the voices of Calvinists from around the world, since the other confessions were written primarily by Calvinists in Europe.

At its Fifth General Assembly in Jakarta, Indonesia in August 2019, the World Reformed Fellowship published a statement on Calvinist theological identity, which provided a narrative description of Calvinism's origins, methods, characteristics, contexts, and continued relevance.

Denominational members 
As of February 2016 there are 72 denominational members.

Africa
 Africa Evangelical Presbyterian Church
 Christian Reformed Church in South Africa 
 Church of England in South Africa
 Egliese Protestante Reformee du Burundi
 Evangelical Presbyterian Church of Ivory Coast
 Evangelical Presbyterian Church of Malawi
 Evangelical Reformed Church of the Democratic Republic of Congo
 God's Healing Ministry (Lagos, Nigeria)
 Greater Grace Ministry, Kampala, Uganda
 Igreja Presbteriana de Angola
 Mission Voile Déchiré, Abidjan, Ivory Coast
 Mount Zion Presbyterian Church of Sierra Leone
 Presbyterian Church of the Eastern Democratic Republic of Congo
 Presbyterian Church in Uganda
 Presbyterian Church of Senegal
 Presbyterian Church of Sierra Leone
 The Protestant Church of Ambohimalaza-Firaisiana, Madagascar
 Reformed Churches in South Africa
 Reformed Presbyterian Church in Africa (Uganda)
 Reformed Presbyterian Church in Africa (Rwanda)
 Reformed Presbyterian Church of Uganda
 Sudanese Reformed Churches

Asia
 Aashish Presbyterian Church (Zone Koshi, East Nepal)
 Biblical Reformed Church of Myanmar
 Bangladesh Presbyterian Church
 Christian Reformed Church in Nepal
 Christian Reformed Church of Sri Lanka
 Evangelical Presbyterian Church of Myanmar
 General Assembly of the Presbyterian Church of the Philippines
 Grace Presbyterian Church of Bangladesh
 India Reformed Presbyterian Church
 Isa-e Church (Bangladesh)
 National Capital Region Presbytery of the Presbyterian Church of the Philippines
 Peace Church Bangladesh
 Presbyterian Church in India
 Presbyterian Church of Bangladesh
 Presbyterian Church of South India
 Presbyterian Free Church of Central India
 Presbyterian Reformed Church in India
 South India Reformed Churches
 Reformed Community Churches in Myanmar
 Reformed Evangelical Church of Indonesia
 Reformed Evangelical Church of Myanmar
 Reformed Presbyterian Church in Myanmar
 Reformed Presbyterian Church of India
 Smyrna House of Prayer Church in Bangladesh 
 United Presbyterian Church of Pakistan
 United Reformed Church in Myanmar
 Christian Reformed Association Malaysia (Malaysia)
 Reformed Fellowship Ahmedabad (Gujarat, West India)
 The United Church of India (India)

Europe
 Associated Presbyterian Church in Scotland
 Evangelical Reformed Baptist Churches in Italy
 Free Church of Scotland
 Lithuanian Evangelical Reformed Church
 Protestant Reformed Christian Church in Croatia
 Protestant Reformed Christian Church in Serbia

North America
 Associate Reformed Presbyterian Church (USA)
 Christian Reformed Church of North America 
 L'Église Réformée du Québec
 Evangelical Presbyterian Church (USA)
 Evangelical Reformed Church in America
 International Peacemaking Church of Christ, (Raleigh NC)
 National Presbyterian Church of Mexico
 Presbyterian Church in America
 Reformed Baptist Churches in North America
 Reformed Bible Churches of Trinidad and Tobago
 Reformed Christian Church of Orlando
 United Christian Church and Bible Institute, USA
 United Episcopal Church of North America

Oceania
 Grace Presbyterian Church of New Zealand
 Presbyterian Church of Australia
 Westminster Presbyterian Church (Bull Creek, Australia)

South America
 Evangelical Presbyterian Church of Peru
 Presbyterian Church of Bolivia
 Presbyterian Church of Brazil
 Reformed Church of Latin America
 United Church of Christ in Colombia

References

External links
Homepage of the WRF

Presbyterianism
International bodies of Reformed denominations
Christian organizations established in 2000